Cumhuriyet Square (meaning Republic Square) is one of the main urban squares of İzmir, Turkey, located between the neighbourhoods of Alsancak and Çankaya in the Konak district. It is a coastal square at the port of İzmir, very close to Pasaport Quay along the shoreline of the Aegean Sea. It is one of the most popular urban squares of İzmir for public gatherings, together with Konak Square and Gündoğdu Square.

History
The square was built as part of the master plan for the reconstruction of İzmir following the Great Fire in 1922.

The monument at the center of the square, which features an equestrian statue of Mustafa Kemal Atatürk, is made of marble and bronze, and was crafted by the renowned Italian sculptor Pietro Canonica in 1927 (he also crafted the Republic Monument at Taksim Square in Istanbul, and other monuments in Ankara, Turkey.)

The square was officially opened in 1932 by Behçet Uz, who served as the Mayor of İzmir between 1931 and 1941.

See also
 Konak Square
 Pietro Canonica

External links
District Municipality of Konak in İzmir

Squares in İzmir